Adam Lepa (17 March 1939 – 27 April 2022) was a Polish Roman Catholic prelate.

Lepa was born in Poland and was ordained to the priesthood in 1962. He served as titular bishop of Regiana and as the auxiliary bishop of the Roman Catholic Archdiocese of Łódź, Poland, from 1988 until his retirement in 2014.

References

1939 births
2022 deaths
Polish Roman Catholic titular bishops
20th-century Roman Catholic bishops in Poland
21st-century Roman Catholic bishops in Poland
Bishops appointed by Pope John Paul II
Clergy from Łódź
Academic staff of Cardinal Stefan Wyszyński University in Warsaw
Recipients of the Pro Memoria Medal